Doodhnath Singh (17 October 1936 – 12 January 2018) was an Indian Hindi language writer, critic and poet. Born in Ballia district of Uttar Pradesh, Singh studied Hindi at the University of Allahabad and served as a Professor there until 1994. In 2014, the government of Uttar Pradesh honoured him with their Bharat Bharti Samman.

Some of Singh's well known works were Sapaat Chehre Wala Aadmi, Aakhri Kalaam, Nishkaasan, Bhai Ka Shok Geet, Dharmakshetra-Kurukshetra and Surang se Lautate Huye. He was also a literary analyst and critic, poet and playwright.

Early life
Born on 17 October 1936 in Sobantha village of Ballia district, Uttar Pradesh to Devkinandan Singh, a farmer, Doodhnath Singh was the eldest of three brothers. His was a family of limited means and after completing his primary schooling from a government school in a nearby village, Singh attended the Merchant Inter College in Chitbara Gaon. At an early age, he developed a keen interest in reading and kept books with him while taking his cattle for grazing. When other shepherds teased him, he climbed on the branches of trees to read his books. With the support of his uncle he completed his graduation and on the recommendation of the then district magistrate of Ballia, Singh later shifted to Allahabad and received his Master of Arts degree in Hindi literature from Allahabad University.

Career
Singh was the principal of Rangoota High School, Kolkata before becoming the sub-editor of a Hindi literature magazine. Here he came in contact with Sumitranandan Pant and was appointed an assistant professor of Hindi language in Allahabad University, a post he held till his retirement in 1994. Some of Singh's well known works were Sapaat Chehre Wala Aadmi, Aakhri Kalaam, Nishkaasan, Maai Ka Shok Geet, Dharmakshetra-Kurukshetra and Surang se Lautate Huye. He also authored three collections of poems, Ek Aur Bhi Aadmi Hai, Agli Shatabdi Ke Naam and Yuva Khusboo. He was also a literary critic and published his analysis of the works of Suryakant Tripathi 'Nirala', Mahadevi Varma and Gajanan Madhav Muktibodh.

He was also the national president of Janwadi Lekhak Sangh.

Personal life and death
Singh was married to Nirmala Thakur. In October 2017, while he was admitted at New Delhi's All India Institutes of Medical Sciences, Singh was diagnosed with prostate cancer. On 26 December, he returned to Allahabad. However, after his condition worsened, Singh was admitted to Phoenix hospital where he suffered cardiac arrest and was placed on life support. He died on 12 January 2018. He was survived by two sons and one daughter. As per his wishes his eyes were donated. Singh's death was condoled by the former chief minister, Akhilesh Yadav and he was cremated at Rasulabad Ghat, where as per traditions, his elder son Animesh Thakur performed his funeral rites.

Bibliography
Source:

Stories
 Sapaat Chehre Wala Aadmi
 Sukhant
 Premkatha Ka Ant Na Koi
 Mai Ka Shokgeet
 Dharmakshetra-Kurukshetra
 Too Foo
 Jalmurgiyon Ka Shikar

Novels
 Aakhri Kalaam
 Nishkashan
 Namo Andhkaar

Poetry collections
 Apni Shatabdi Ke Naam
 Ek Aur Bhi Aadmi Hai
  Yuva Khusboo
 Tumhare Liye
  Surang Se Lautte Huye

Play
 Yamgatha

Criticism
 Nirala: Atmahanta Aastha
 Mahadevi
 Muktibodha: Sahitya Mein Nayi Pravittian

Editor
 Tarapath
 Bhuveneshwar Samagra
 Do Sharan
 Ek Shamsher Bhi Hai
 Ot Mein Khada Mai Bolta Hoon
 Saat Bhoomikayein

Memoir
 Laut Aa o Dhar

References

Further reading
 
 
 
 

1936 births
2018 deaths
Hindi-language writers
People from Ballia district
Indian literary critics
Poets from Uttar Pradesh
Novelists from Uttar Pradesh
University of Allahabad alumni
Academic staff of the University of Allahabad
20th-century Indian short story writers
20th-century Indian novelists
20th-century Indian poets
Deaths from prostate cancer
Deaths from cancer in India